This page makes mention of prominent individuals of Romanichal descent.

listed alphabetically by surname
  Adam Ant (born 1954) – English punk/New Wave musician; of Romanichal descent
  Jake Bowers (born 1971) – journalist and broadcaster
  James Carver (born 1969) – British MEP (Member of the European Parliament)
  Charlie Chaplin (1889–1977) - English comic actor, filmmaker, and composer
  Louise Doughty (born 1963) – English writer
  Freddy Eastwood (born 1983) – Welsh footballer
  Tracey Emin (born 1963) – British artist shortlisted for the Turner Prize, also known as one of the chief Young British Artists of the late 20th century
  George Bramwell Evens (1884–1943) – English journalist and writer
  James Squire Farnell (1825–1888) – grandson of James Squire and the first Australian-born Premier of New South Wales
  Johnny Frankham (born 1948) – English light heavyweight boxer who knocked Muhammad Ali to the floor in an exhibition fight
  Francis Hindes Groome (1851–1902) – English writer
  Ian Hancock (born 1942) – Romani scholar and activist, born in the UK, living in the USA, Professor at the University of Texas
  Bob Hoskins (1942–2014) – actor; of one-quarter Romanichal descent
  Raby Howell (1869 – 1937) – nineteenth-century English footballer (Liverpool, Sheffield United, and Preston North End)
  Jentina (born 1984) – British hip hop/R&B singer, rapper, songwriter, and model
  Priscilla Kelly (born 1997) – professional wrestler
  Denny Laine (born 1944) aka Brian Hines – Moody Blues singer and guitarist
  Albert Lee (born 1943) – English guitarist. 
  Jackie Leven (1950–2011) – Scottish songwriter and folk musician
  Cher Lloyd (born 1993) – English singer and rapper, whose mother is Romanichal
  Joe Longthorne (born 1955) – English singer and impressionist
  David Morley (born 1964) – British poet, critic, anthologist, editor, and scientist
  Róisín Mullins (born 1982) – English & Irish TV presenter, TV talent show judge, professional Irish dancer, stage show owner, and choreographer
  Xavier Petulengro (1859-1957) – writer and broadcaster, who frequently broadcast on BBC radio in the 1930s and 1940s
  Robert Plant (born 1948) – English singer and songwriter (former vocalist of Led Zeppelin); his mother is of Romanichal origin
  Billy Joe Saunders (born 1989) – English boxer who won silver and became the first Romani boxer to represent Great Britain at the 2008 Olympic Games
  Lady Eleanor Furneaux Smith (1902–1945) – English writer of popular novels often romanticized historical and Romani settings; she believed her paternal great-grandmother to have been Romanichal
  Rodney Smith (1860–1947) – British evangelist who conducted evangelistic campaigns in the United States and the UK
  James Squire (1754–1822) – on the First Fleet to Australia; founder of the Australian brewing industry in 1798
 Randolph Turpin (1928–1966) - English boxer who won the world middleweight championship by defeating Sugar Ray Robinson; his mother was of Romanichal origin
 Dick Turpin (1920–1990) - English boxer who was the first black fighter to win a British boxing title; his mother was of Romanichal origin
 Jackie Turpin (1925-2010) - English boxer; his mother was of Romanichal origin
 Cherry Valentine (1993-2022) - English drag queen and contestant on the second season of RuPaul's Drag Race UK
  Henry Wharton  (born 1967) – English middleweight boxing champion.

See also
 List of Romani people

References

 
 
Romani-related lists